Ayyampuzha  is a village and panchayat in Angamaly  Ernakulam district in the Indian state of Kerala.  Kalady plantations is a part of the panchaayat.

Tourism
Ayyampuzha shares the famous Athirappilly Falls with Athirappilly in Thrissur.

Demographics
 India census, Ayyampuzha had a population of 14,902 with 7665 males and 7237 females.

See also
Angamaly
Ernakulam District
Kochi

References

Villages in Ernakulam district